Phryganodes nesusalis is a moth in the family Crambidae. It was described by Francis Walker in 1859. It is found in Angola and Sierra Leone.

References

Spilomelinae
Moths described in 1859